Khasan Anzorovich Khatsukov (born 27 July 1995) is a Russian football player. He most recently played for the Albanian club KF Bylis Ballsh.

Club career
He made his professional debut in the Russian Professional Football League for FC Strogino Moscow on 8 August 2014 in a game against FC Pskov-747 Pskov.

References

External links
 
 

1995 births
Living people
Russian footballers
Association football midfielders
FK Jedinstvo Bijelo Polje players
FC Kamza players
Russian expatriate footballers
Expatriate footballers in Montenegro
Expatriate footballers in Albania
KF Bylis Ballsh players
FC Strogino Moscow players